The 1985–86 Rugby Football League season was the 91st ever season of professional rugby league football in Britain. Sixteen teams competed from August, 1985 until May, 1986 for the Slalom Lager Championship.

Season summary

Slalom Lager League Champions were Halifax.Halifax finished on top of the First Division table to claim their fourth, and to date, last championship, but Warrington defeated them in the Rugby League Premiership competition.Paul Bishop of Warrington scored a record equalling 5 drop goals in the Premiership semi-final against Wigan on 11 May 1986.

Castleford were 15-14 winners over Hull Kingston Rovers in the Silk Cut Challenge Cup.

Wigan were 11-8 winners over Hull Kingston Rovers in the final for the John Player Special Trophy.

Warrington were 38-10 winners over Halifax in the Premiership Trophy. Warrington's Australian forward Les Boyd was awarded the Harry Sunderland Trophy as man-of-the-match.

2nd Division Champions were Leigh.Bridgend Blue Dragons and Southend Invicta dropped out of the competition. The promotion scheme was changed to 3-up 3-down.

Wigan beat Warrington 34–8 to win the Lancashire County Cup, and Hull Kingston Rovers beat Castleford 22–18 to win the Yorkshire County Cup.

League Tables

Division One

Final Standings

Division Two

Challenge Cup

The 1985-86 Silk Cut Challenge Cup Final was played by  Castleford and Hull Kingston Rovers at Wembley before a crowd of 82,134. was won by Castleford defeated Hull Kingston Rovers 15-14. Castleford's scrum half back, Bob Beardmore was awarded the Lance Todd Trophy as man of the match.

League Cup

Premiership

Sources
1985-86 Rugby Football League season at wigan.rlfans.com

1985 in English rugby league
1986 in English rugby league
Rugby Football League seasons